, multiple consumer-oriented, optical-disk media formats are or were available:
 Compact Disc ("CD"): digital audio disc
 CD-R: write once read many (WORM) CD
 CD-RW: rewriteable CD
 DVD: digital video disc
 DVD-R: WORM DVD defined by the DVD Forum
 DVD-RW: rewritable DVD defined by DVD Forum
 DVD+R: WORM DVD defined by the DVD+RW Alliance
 DVD+RW: rewriteable DVD defined by DVD+RW Alliance
 DVD-RAM rewriteable, capable of random write access, not generally format-compatible with DVD
 Blu-ray Disc: DVD successor, capable of high-definition video
 BD-R: WORM Blu-ray Disc by the Blu-ray Disc Association
 BD-RE: rewriteable BD
 HD DVD: failed HD format defined by the DVD Forum
 Ultra HD Blu-ray: BD successor, capable of 4K resolution

Overview

Nomenclature
In optical storage, three types of storage are usually recognized, and given customary abbreviations: read-only ("ROM"), Write once ("R") and read/writable ("RW", or for Blu-ray, "E" for "erasable"). Examples:
 CD-ROM represents the CD format, in its pre-recorded "read only" use
 DVD+R represents a DVD "+" disc which can be written once only
 DVD-RW represents a DVD "-" disc which can be read or written many times
 BD-RE represents a Blu-ray disc which can be read or written many times.
In addition some of these media support MultiLevel Recording formats, for example dual layer (written as "DL"), and DVD also supports a "RAM" version (similar to RW), although this is not widely used in the popular consumer market.

Coverage
DVD has three variants, known as "+", "-" and "RAM". For the purposes of this article, DVD+ and DVD- are considered together as "DVD"; they share many of the same characteristics. Differences are noted below.

DVD-RAM, which did not gain wide penetration of the consumer market, is discussed briefly in the same section but otherwise excluded from the article.

ROM formats are excluded; they perform rather like write-once "R" formats, without the capacity to write to the disc. Likewise other niche formats are excluded, such as GD-ROM (used by some Sega game consoles) and Ultra Density Optical and the like (commercial archiving storage rather than mass market).

Thus the article covers the following popular recordable formats: CD (CD-R, CD-RW); DVD (DVD±R, DVD±RW); HD DVD; Blu-ray (BD-R, BD-E), and for all except CD, their respective dual- or multi-layer formats.

History 

Although research into optical data storage has been ongoing for many decades, the first popular system was CD, introduced in 1982, adapted from audio (CD-DA) to data storage (the CD-ROM format) with the 1985 Yellow Book, and re-adapted as the first mass market optical storage medium with CD-R and CD-RW in 1988. Compact Disc is still the de facto standard for audio recordings, although its place for other multimedia recordings and optical data storage has largely been superseded by DVD.

DVD (initially an acronym of "Digital Video Disc", then backronymed as "Digital Versatile Disc" and officially just "DVD") was the mass market successor to CD. DVD was rolled out in 1996, again initially for video and audio. DVD recordable formats developed some time later: DVD- in late 1997 and DVD+ in 2002. Although DVD was initially intended to prevent a format war in fact one did arise between these two formats. It was resolved with both surviving however: DVD-R predominating for stand-alone DVD recorders and players, and (for computers) most DVD devices being engineered as dual format, to be compatible with both. As of 2007 DVD is the de facto standard for pre-recorded movies, and popular storage of data beyond the capacity of CD.

With the development of high-definition television, and the popularization of broadband and digital storage of movies, a further format development took place, again giving rise to two camps: HD DVD and Blu-ray, based upon a switch from red to blue-violet laser and tighter engineering tolerances. As of 2007 both have significant releases in the pre-recorded movie sector, but they are still only commencing their roll-out for data storage and more general use, and have as yet made little impact on the global market for data storage. The result of this format war is not yet determined.

Technology comparisons

Speed
Optical device speeds are often quoted as a multiple of a "basic speed" for that type of device. Thus for CD, the basic speed is 150 kB/s, so a CD-recordable device may be quoted as "4x" or "6x" to indicate a speed of 600 kB/s and 900 kB/s respectively.

Typical values are:

CD

DVD

Blu-ray

sources: 

Also, these speeds are not constant, and are usually a measure of the maximum possible speed a drive can achieve.

Data Capacity

Filing systems

Copy protection systems

Optical technology used

Other information

DVD+, DVD- and DVD RAM

Optical storage devices excluded from article
The following are examples of optical storage media excluded from this article:

 Holographic data storage - either still in development, or available but generally only encountered in niche usage as of 2007.
 Laserdisc - not used for recordable data storage in the computing world, although recordable formats did exist briefly.
 Optical jukebox - hold massive amounts of data on multiple discs allowing scalability into the petabyte range.

See also
 Optical storage
 Holographic data storage
 Holographic versatile disc
 MultiLevel Recording
 Comparison of high definition optical disc formats

References

External links
 Understanding Recordable & Rewritable DVD by Hugh Bennett
 Understanding CD-R & CD-RW by Hugh Bennett

Technological comparisons
Optical computer storage